This is a list of members of the Victorian Legislative Council between 1996 and 1999. As half of the Legislative Council faced election at each general election until 2006, one half of these members were elected at the 1992 state election, while the other half was elected at the 1996 state election.

Members of the Parliament of Victoria by term
20th-century Australian politicians